GM 2 gangliosidosis refers to several similar genetic disorders:
 Tay–Sachs disease
 Sandhoff disease
 GM2-gangliosidosis, AB variant